Avatar: The Last Airbender (abbreviated as ATLA), or simply Avatar, is an American multimedia franchise consisting of two animated television series, a live-action film, comics, books, video games, home media, and soundtracks. The franchise began with the animated television series Avatar: The Last Airbender, which aired on Nickelodeon from 2005 to 2008. The series is set in an Asian-inspired fantasy world in which some people can telekinetically manipulate (or "bend") one of the four classical elements: air, water, earth, or fire. Only the titular "Avatar" can bend all four elements and is responsible for maintaining balance in the world.

Since its original release, Avatar has developed into a franchise spanning works in various media. A sequel animated television series, The Legend of Korra, aired on Nickelodeon from 2012 to 2014 and has since expanded into its own sub-franchise. The storylines of both animated series have been continued in comic book form. Other franchise tie-ins include novelizations, art books, companion books, video games, and home media releases. In 2010, the original animated series was adapted into a live-action film titled The Last Airbender. The film itself spawned a novelization series, two graphic novels, two video games, a soundtrack album, and DVD and blu-ray releases.

In February 2021, Nickelodeon announced the creation of Avatar Studios, "a division designed to create original content spanning animated series and movies based on the franchise’s world." The original creators and executive producers Michael DiMartino and Bryan Konietzko will run the studio as co-chief creative officers, with an animated theatrical film set to start production in 2021 as its first release. A live-action remake of the original series, developed by Netflix without DiMartino's or Konietzko's involvement, began development in 2019.

Premise
The franchise is set in an Asian-inspired fantasy world that is divided into four nations: the Water Tribes, the Fire Nation, the Air Nomads, and the Earth Kingdom. Within each nation lives people capable of telekinetically manipulating (referred to as "bending" in the franchise) one of the four elements: water, earth, fire, or air.

The titular "Avatar" is the only person who can bend all four elements, and they are responsible for maintaining spiritual balance in the world. After an Avatar's death, they are reincarnated into a new person who takes on the Avatar mantle.

Television series

Avatar: The Last Airbender (2005–2008)

The first series in the franchise, Avatar: The Last Airbender follows the young avatar Aang as he attempts to end the Fire Nation's war of conquest against the other three nations. Aang, who is the last surviving Air Nomad due to a genocide perpetrated by the Fire Nation, is joined by the teenage waterbender Katara, her non-bending brother Sokka, and later the blind earthbending prodigy Toph as he journeys to master bending the elements so that he can defeat the Fire Nation's leader, Fire Lord Ozai, and restore peace once and for all. The series also depicts the journey of Prince Zuko, Ozai's disgraced and exiled son, as he tries to restore his honor and his claim to the throne.

The Legend of Korra (2012–2014)

Set 70 years after the original series, The Legend of Korra follows Aang's successor as Avatar, a waterbender named Korra, who moves to the new, multi-ethnic Republic City to learn airbending from Aang's son, Tenzin. She befriends a firebending and earthbending pair of brothers, Mako and Bolin, and the industrial heiress Asami Sato, and contends with a series of political upheavals, including a rising anti-bending movement, a civil war in the Water Tribes, an anarchist conspiracy, and the rise of an authoritarian government in the Earth Kingdom.

Avatar: The Last Airbender (live-action) 

Produced by Netflix, Avatar: The Last Airbender is a live-action adaptation of the first series by Albert Kim. Michael Dante DiMartino and Bryan Konietzko, originally set to be the showrunners, abandoned the project due to creative differences.

Untitled animated series (2025) 
In December 2022, it was reported that Avatar Studios and Paramount Pictures were developing a new series slated for release in 2025. Set about 100 years after The Legend of Korra, the series will follow Korra's successor as an Avatar, an unnamed earthbender.

Films

The Last Airbender (2010)

The Last Airbender is a 2010 live-action adaptation of the first season of the animated series Avatar: The Last Airbender by M. Night Shyamalan. The film was widely panned by critics and fans of the animated series, and has since been considered one of the worst films ever made and took in $319 million at the worldwide box office.

Untitled animated Avatar Studios film (2025)
In February 2021, it was announced that a theatrical animated film produced by Avatar Studios will be released by Paramount Pictures, with production set to begin later in 2021. Serving as the first project from Avatar Studios, it will be directed by Lauren Montgomery, with Bryan Konietzko, Michael Dante DiMartino and Eric Coleman producing. It is set to be released on October 10, 2025. Two other animated theatrical films are also in the works. In July 2022 during the San Diego Comic-Con it was announced that the first film will center around the original characters. In October 2022, it was announced that Flying Bark Productions would provide animation for the first film.

Comics

Avatar: The Last Airbender (2006–present)

The Last Airbender (2010)

The Legend of Korra (2016–present)

Books

Novels

Art books

Others

Video games

Podcast

Avatar: Braving the Elements (2021–present)
Avatar: Braving the Elements is a podcast where the voice of Zuko, Dante Basco, and the voice of Korra, Janet Varney, goes through the shows episode by episode. They often get  co-cast as guests, and sometimes get visited by the creators, Michael Dante DiMartino and Bryan Konietzko.

Cast

Home media

Avatar: The Last Airbender

The Last Airbender

The Legend of Korra

Fan media 

The franchise has gained a considerably large following over the years, and some fans created a project known as The Legend of Genji, a fan project taking place after The Legend of Korra, and revolving around the new Avatar and his friends after Korra's death.

Soundtracks

Notes

References

Franchise
Franchise
Avatar: The Last Airbender